Condarco is a surname. Notable people with the surname include:

Gonzalo Condarco, Bolivian sculptor
José Antonio Álvarez Condarco (1780–1855), Argentinian soldier